El Paraíso Airport  is an airstrip serving El Paraíso in the pampa of the Beni Department in Bolivia.

See also

Transport in Bolivia
List of airports in Bolivia

References

External links 
OpenStreetMap - El Paraíso
OurAirports - El Paraíso
Fallingrain - El Paraíso Airport
HERE/Nokia - El Paraíso

Airports in Beni Department